Aurélie Perrillat-Collomb Storti (born 3 May 1980) is a French cross-country skier. She competed at the 2002 Winter Olympics and the 2006 Winter Olympics.

Cross-country skiing results
All results are sourced from the International Ski Federation (FIS).

Olympic Games

World Championships

World Cup

Season standings

References

External links
 

1980 births
Living people
French female cross-country skiers
Olympic cross-country skiers of France
Cross-country skiers at the 2002 Winter Olympics
Cross-country skiers at the 2006 Winter Olympics
People from Champagnole
Sportspeople from Jura (department)
21st-century French women